Jatun Urqu (Quechua Inka Inca, pirqa wall, "Inca wall", also spelled Inca Perkha) is a mountain in the Bolivian Andes which reaches a height of approximately . It is located in the Cochabamba Department, Mizque Province, Alalay Municipality. It lies northeast of Jatun Urqu.

References 

Mountains of Cochabamba Department